The Mayoral election of 1985 in Pittsburgh, Pennsylvania was held on Tuesday, November 5, 1985. The incumbent mayor, Richard Caliguiri of the Democratic Party chose to run for his third term.

Results
Calagiri won by over 50 points in a city where Democrats outnumber Republicans by a 5 to 1 margin. The Republican nominee was attorney Henry Sneath. A total of 81,997 votes were cast.

References

1985 Pennsylvania elections
1985 United States mayoral elections
1985
1980s in Pittsburgh
November 1985 events in the United States